Tulosesus plagioporus  is a species of mushroom producing fungus in the family Psathyrellaceae.

Taxonomy 

It was first described as Coprinus plagioporus by the mycologist Henri Romagnesi in 1941.

In 2001 a phylogenetic study resulted in a major reorganization and reshuffling of that genus and this species was transferred to Coprinellus.

The species was known as Coprinellus plagioporus until 2020 when the German mycologists Dieter Wächter & Andreas Melzer reclassified many species in the Psathyrellaceae family based on phylogenetic analysis.

References

plagioporus
Fungi described in 1941
Tulosesus